Antonio Mateos is a set decorator. He won an Academy Award in the category Best Art Direction for the film Patton.

Selected filmography
 Patton (1970)

References

External links

Set decorators
Best Art Direction Academy Award winners
Year of birth missing (living people)
Living people